Frank Mallory may refer to:
 Frank B. Mallory (chemist) (1932/33–2017), for whom the Mallory reaction is named
 Frank Burr Mallory (1862–1941), American pathologist for whom the Mallory body is named
 Frank F. Mallory, Canadian biologist